Timo Tolkki's Avalon (also known simply as Avalon) is a Finnish metal opera project created by Timo Tolkki (formerly of Stratovarius, Revolution Renaissance and Symfonia) in 2013.

According to Tolkki "I find the Metal Opera concept fascinating and logical to me at this point of my career. I love classical music and just like in Classical Opera, in the Metal Opera you can also create stories and have almost limitless possibilities musically".

History

Foundation and The Land of New Hope (2013) 
The project, including its name, was conceived by Frontiers Records's founder Serafino Perugino in 2010. He called Tolkki back then and asked if he wanted to do a metal opera like that.

The project's debut album, The Land of New Hope, was released on 17 May 2013 through Frontiers Records. The album features performances by vocalists Elize Ryd, Rob Rock, Michael Kiske, Russell Allen, Sharon den Adel and Tony Kakko, as well as the participation of guest musicians Alex Holzwarth on drums and both Jens Johansson and Derek Sherinian on keyboards.

Tobias Sammet, German musician and mentor of Avantasia, another metal opera which had its 6th album released in March 2013, received the news of Timo Tolkki's own project with initial sarcasm, stating: "Wow, someone is extraordinarily creative here: the title, the guests, the timing... What a funny coincidence, isn't it?! But there have been thousands of Metal Operas, especially after Avantasia. Such is business...". However, he later stated: "There are a lot of metal operas out there, and I have to deal with that. If something is very successful or even not successful then other people may feel inspired by it. It's Timo Tolkki (laughs) what can I say, he's a great guy and he does what he does. I wish him the best of luck."

When asked about if he was aware that this project would be compared to Avantasia, Timo replied that "Nobody owns a franchise to 'metal operas' which is not really an operatic format because it doesn't have any real dialogue between the singers."

Angels of the Apocalypse (2014) 
In October 2013 Timo launched a news website for the project in which he announced the sequel to The Land of New Hope, which was provisionally titled Avalon II. The cast of guest musicians will be revealed one by one. Simone Simons of Epica fame is the first confirmed singer. Floor Jansen will play the leading role. It was also announced that Timo's former bandmates in Stratovarius, drummer Tuomo Lassila and keyboardist Antti Ikonen will play on this album.

On 28 January Timo revealed title of the album (Angels of the Apocalypse) and the rest of the cast: Fabio Lione (Rhapsody of Fire, Angra), David DeFeis (Virgin Steele), Elize Ryd (Amaranthe) and Caterina Nix. Timo also announced that there will be a contest for guitar and keyboard players, with the winners getting a chance to perform a solo with him in one of the songs.

A European tour was planned for May 2014, coinciding with the release of the album.

Return to Eden (2019) and The Enigma Birth (2021) 
In early 2019, Timo Tolkki announced the third Avalon album and remaining part of the Avalon trilogy, Return to Eden, with the main working song, "Promises".

The fourth Avalon studio album, The Enigma Birth was released on 18 June 2021, extending the Avalon conceptual saga.

Members

Instrumentalists

Singers

Discography

References

External links

 

Heavy metal supergroups
Finnish power metal musical groups
Finnish symphonic metal musical groups
Musical groups established in 2013
Frontiers Records artists
2013 establishments in Finland